Lygosoma siamense, the Siamese supple skink, is a species of skink found in Vietnam, Laos, Cambodia, Thailand, and Peninsular Malaysia.

References

siamense
Reptiles of Cambodia
Reptiles of Laos
Reptiles of the Malay Peninsula
Reptiles of Thailand
Reptiles of Vietnam
Reptiles described in 2018
Taxa named by Cameron D. Siler
Taxa named by Brendan B. Heitz
Taxa named by Drew R. Davis
Taxa named by Elyse S. Freitas
Taxa named by Anchalee Aowphol
Taxa named by Korkwan Termprayoon
Taxa named by Larry Lee Grismer